Michel Menard or Michel Ménard may refer to:
Michel Ménard (born 1961), member of the National Assembly of France
Michel Branamour Menard (1805-1856), Canadian-born trader and founder of Galveston, Texas